December Love is a 1922 dramatic romance novel by the British writer Robert Hichens.

References

Bibliography
 Vinson, James. Twentieth-Century Romance and Gothic Writers. Macmillan, 1982.

1922 British novels
Novels by Robert Hichens